Malakeh (also Romanized as Malākeh; also known as Malācheh, Mallācheh, and Mulāchi) is a village in Bahmanshir-e Jonubi Rural District, in the Central District of Abadan County, Khuzestan Province, Iran. At the 2006 census, its population was 585, in 111 families.

References 

Populated places in Abadan County